Suddala Hanmanthu was a noted Indian poet of the mid 1900s.  He wrote songs like Palleturi pillagada... pasulagaase monagaada... (from the movie Maa Bhoomi).

Early life
Suddala Hanmanthu was born in Paladugu village, Mothkur mandal. Later, he moved to suddala village of Gundala Mandal in Yadadri bhuvanagiri district, Telangana State in India.

Career
Suddala Hanmanthu's poetry inspired the people of Telangana to participate in the communist-led peasant struggle against the oppressive rule of feudal lords and the Nizam. Along with his contemporary leader Gurram Yadagiri Reddy, a famous communist leader, he fought against Doras and Gadi's rule.

This struggle was known in Indian history as the Telangana Rebellion. His themes were freedom from the bonded labour known as Vetti Chakiri, democracy, liberation, equality and communism.

His Telugu folk song, Palletoori Pillagada, mobilised the people of his region. It was included in the movie, Maa Bhoomi (1980). The movie Rajanna, starring Nagarjuna is inspired by Sri Suddala Hanumanthu's life.

Personal life
Suddala Hanmanthu was married to Janakamma and his son Suddala Ashok Teja is a contemporary lyricist. He earned fame for his Telugu songs and was awarded the National Film Award for Best Lyrics in the year 2003. They also had another two sons and a daughter. Famous Telugu actor Uttej is his grandson, son of his daughter.

References

Telugu poets
Indian male poets
Telangana Rebellion
Poets from Telangana
Living people
People from Nalgonda district
20th-century Indian poets
20th-century Indian male writers
Year of birth missing (living people)